Glaucine is an aporphine alkaloid found in several different plant species in the family Papaveraceae such as Glaucium flavum, Glaucium oxylobum and Corydalis yanhusuo, and in other plants like Croton lechleri in the family Euphorbiaceae.

It has bronchodilator, neuroleptic and antiinflammatory effects, acting as a PDE4 inhibitor and calcium channel blocker, and is used medically as an antitussive in some countries. TLRs plays role in its anti inflammatory effects. Glaucine may produce side effects such as sedation, fatigue, and a hallucinogenic effect characterised by colourful visual images, and has been detected as a novel psychoactive drug. In a 2019 publication, the isomer (R)-glaucine is reported to be a positive allosteric modulator of the 5-HT2A receptor, which is also associated with the hallucinogenic effects of substances such as psilocybin and mescaline.

Chemistry

Stereoisomerism
It was believed that only the (S)-form of glaucine occurs in nature until (R)-glaucine was found in fire poppy (Papaver californicum).

Mechanism of action 
Glaucine binds to the benzothiazepine site on L-type Ca2+-channels, thereby blocking calcium ion channels in smooth muscle like the human bronchus. Glaucine has no effect on intracellular calcium stores, but rather, does not allow the entry of Ca2+ after intracellular stores have been depleted. Ca2+ influx is a vital component in the process of muscular contraction, and the blocking of this influx therefore reduces the ability of the muscle to contract. In this way, glaucine can prevent smooth muscle from contracting, allowing it to relax.

Glaucine has also been demonstrated to be a dopamine receptor antagonist, favoring D1 and D1-like receptors. It is also a non-competitive selective inhibitor of PDE4 in human bronchial tissue and granulocytes. PDE4 is an isoenzyme that hydrolyzes cyclic AMP to regulate human bronchial tone (along with PDE3). Yet as a PDE4 inhibitor, glaucine possesses very low potency.

Glaucine has also recently  been found to have an effect on the neuronal 5-HT2A receptors, which are responsible for the hallucinogenic effects of classical psychedelics. It also inhibits MAO enzymes. Its enantiomers effect are same for adrenergic receptor yet different for 5-HT receptor. Both (R)-Glaucine and (S)-Glaucine antagonizes α1 receptor but (S)-Glaucine is partial agonist of 5-HT2 subtypes whereas (R)-Glaucine is positive allosteric modulator of 5-HT2.

Uses

Medical 
It is currently used as an antitussive agent in  Iceland, as well as Romania, Bulgaria, Russia and other eastern European countries. Bulgarian pharmaceutical company Sopharma sells glaucine in tablet form, where a single dose contains 40 mg and the half-life is indicated to be 6–8 hours. When ingested orally has been shown to increase airway conductance in humans, and has been investigated as a treatment for asthma.

Glaucine has been reported to reduce blood pressure, heart rate and possess anticonvulsant and antinoiciceptive effect in animals

Recreational 
Reports of recreational use of glaucine have recently been published, and effects include dissociative-type symptoms; feeling detached and 'in another world', as well as nausea, vomiting and dilated pupils. These reports mirror those about the effects of clinical use, which state dissociative-type symptoms as well as lethargy, fatigue, hallucinations. Investigation of side effects in a clinical setting also reports that the hallucinatory effects manifest as bright and colorful visualizations. They also report that patients perceive their environments clearly yet feel detached from it; "the patient sees and understands everything and is oriented well enough, but cannot take a clear and adequate action".

One particular report of recreational use gone awry described the form of distribution as tablets being marketed as a 1-benzylpiperazine (BZP)-free "herbal high" which the patient referred to as "head candy".

See also

References 

Alkaloids found in Euphorbiaceae
Alkaloids found in Papaveraceae
Antitussives
PDE4 inhibitors
Aporphine alkaloids
Phenol ethers